Loo is a village in the municipality of Duiven in the province of Gelderland, the Netherlands. The village has a ferry connection to Huissen. A couple of houses of Loo are part of Huissen, Lingewaard, because they were on a former river island which used to belong the Duchy of Cleves.

History 
It was first mentioned in 1294 or 1295 as Loy, and means forest. The village developed near the Rhine. A chapel was built in the 15th century, and was replaced by the St. Antonius Church in 1875. The havezate Lowaard was first mentioned in 1467. It was extensively rebuilt between 1558 and 1569. In 1742, it was transformed into a farm. In 1840, Loo was home to 242 people.

Gallery

References 

Populated places in Gelderland
Duiven
Lingewaard